Baravand-e Olya (also Romanized as Barāvand-e ‘Olyā and Barevand-e ‘Olyā; also known as Barāvand and Barāvand-e Bālā) is a village in Qalkhani Rural District, Gahvareh District, Dalahu County, Kermanshah Province, Iran. At the 2006 census, its population was 87, in 18 families.

References 

Populated places in Dalahu County